March Township is a geographic township and former municipality originally part of Carleton County in eastern Ontario, Canada.  It is currently part of the City of Ottawa. It is located in the western part of the county, bordered to the northwest by Torbolton Township, to the southwest by Huntley Township, to the east by Nepean, to the south by Goulbourn Township and to the north by the Ottawa River. According to the Canada 2001 Census, the Township had a population of approximately 26,650.

History
The township took its name from the subsidiary title of Charles Lennox, 4th Duke of Richmond, the Earl of March. The township was established in the 1820s. Early settlers in the area included Hamnett Kirkes Pinhey and Doctor Alexander James Christie. 

Long before the Royal Military College of Canada was established in 1876, retired British navy and army officers who had settled in March township, proposed a military college boarding school for boys on the Great Lakes on naval and military lines in 1826. 

By 1866, March was a post village with a population of about 100, situated in the township of March, and county of Carleton. The postmaster was T. Read. Citizens included W.H. Berry, brewer; George I McMurtry tanner, saddle and harness maker; William Boucher, saw mill proprietor; D Munroe, hotel keeper; Horace Pinhey, saw mill owner and D. McMurtry, general merchant. 

In 1978, all of the township became part of the new city of Kanata. The village of Dunrobin, Ontario was also located in the township. In 2001, this area was amalgamated into the new city of Ottawa.

Reeves 
1850 Hamnett Kirkes Pinhey
1856 R.Y. Greene
1864 W.H. Berry
1868 R.Y. Greene
1871 William Richardson
1876 R.Y. Greene
1897 n/a
1907 S. Gilchrist
1909 O. Riddell
1910 S. Gilchrist
1911 O. Riddell
1912 Godfrey Armitrage
1913 A.H. Acres
1917 George Armstrong
1923 C.R. Irvine
1925 Godfrey Armitrage
1932 John M. Storey
1949 Claude V. Riddell
1960 Ernest McCord
1962 Charles Sweeney
1963 Harold N. Craig
1968 John Mlacak
1976 Marianne Wilkinson

See also
List of townships in Ontario

Notes

References  

 Woods, Shirley E. Jr. Ottawa: The Capital of Canada, Toronto: Doubleday Canada, 1980. 

Former municipalities now in Ottawa
Geographic townships in Ontario
Populated places disestablished in 1978